Vecheslovo is a rural locality (a village) in Nikolskoye Rural Settlement, Ust-Kubinsky District, Vologda Oblast, Russia. The population was 17 as of 2002.

Geography 
Vecheslovo is located 25 km northwest of Ustye (the district's administrative centre) by road. Bogoslovo is the nearest rural locality.

References 

Rural localities in Ust-Kubinsky District